The Dickson Plan is a school transfer system implemented in North County Armagh in Northern Ireland. It is a two tier system in which the majority of pupils in the Craigavon Borough Council Area and parts of Armagh City and District Council Area attend Junior High Schools for 3 years before transferring to Senior High Schools to complete their compulsory education in Key Stage 4. It does not exclude the possibility of academic selection at age 11 through the 11 Plus exam, whereupon pupils may proceed to the grammar school system on completion of primary education or carry on to other secondary schools. For those who opt out of the 11 Plus or don't pass it, they may go through an academic selection process at age 14 by taking internal exams that are set by the individual grammar schools, and entering the grammar sector at age 14.

The Dickson Plan wasn't affected by the education reforms being pressed by Northern Ireland Education Minister, Caitríona Ruane, which required the controversial removal of academic selection at age 11 in the rest of Northern Ireland.

The Dickson Plan was in the process of being demolished by the Education Minister John O'Dowd, who was planning to amalgamate the Junior High Schools and the Senior Education Schools, and create a Comprehensive system throughout Northern Ireland. This was causing controversy throughout the local area. Mr O'Dowd, in light of overwhelming parental support for the Dickson plan, backed down from abolishing the system. Over 80% of parents were in favour of maintaining the present system.  Mr O'Dowd had to bow to this support.

However, three Catholic schools ( St Paul's Junior High, St Mary's Junior High and St Michael's Grammar) within the Lurgan area have recently opted out of the Dickson plan and amalgamated to form a new school. The new school is called St Ronan's College and is a non-selective co-educational comprehensive school which will cater for up to 1600+ pupils. A completely new school will be built at a cost of £32 million and is due to open its doors in 2019. In the meantime St Ronan's will operate from three sites.

References

 
Education in the United Kingdom